Phycicoccus ginsengisoli is a species of Gram positive, strictly aerobic, non-endospore-forming bacterium. The species was initially isolated from soil from a ginseng field in Gochang County, South Korea. The species was first described in 2016, and its name refers to the source of isolation (ginseng soil).

The optimum pH is 7.0, and can grow in pH 6.0-9.0.

References

Intrasporangiaceae
Bacteria described in 2016